The maneless zebra (Equus quagga borensis) is a subspecies of the plains zebra spread over the northern parts of eastern Africa. It ranges in northwestern Kenya (from Uasin Gishu and Lake Baringo) to the Karamoja district of Uganda. It is also found in eastern South Sudan, east of the White Nile (for example, in Boma National Park). It is the northernmost subspecies of the plains zebra. The last remaining substantial population is in Kidepo Valley National Park.

Taxonomy

The maneless zebra was first described in 1921 by the swedish zoologist Einar Lönnberg. He gave it the name Equus borensis based on a type specimen collected near the town of Bor in Southern Sudan. Later the maneless zebras have been described by several others. Also in 1954 by Tony Henley, then a ranger in the game department of the Uganda Protectorate based in Moroto and in charge of Karamoja District. Recently, the animals in the Kidepo Valley National Park have been studied by the Kidepo Wildlife Foundation.

In a research study conducted by J. Pluháček, L. Bartoš and J. Vichová, it was found that out of four plain zebra subspecies, the maneless zebra was the only subspecies that male infanticides were not found.

References

Further reading

External links 
 Image of running Equus quagga borensis among white-eared kob antelopes at Boma National Park, Sudan
image of a maneless zebra at flickr

Equus (genus)
Mammals of Kenya
Mammals of South Sudan
Mammals of Uganda
Zebras